The 1946 United States Senate election in Florida was held on November 5, 1946. 

Incumbent Florida Senator Charles O. Andrews did not run for re-election and died on September 18. Former Governor Spessard Holland, who served from 1941-1945, had already won the May Democratic primary (usually tantamount to victory in the solidly Democratic South), and was appointed to the vacant seat by Governor Millard F. Caldwell. Holland was then elected in the regular fall election.

Democratic primary

Candidates
 Polly Rose Balfe, former member of the Democratic National Committee (DNC).
 Henry M. Burch
 Robert A. "Lex" Green, U.S. Representative from Starke
 Spessard L. Holland, Governor of Florida

Results

Republican primary

Candidates
 J. Harry Schad

Results
Schad was unopposed for the Republican nomination.

General election

Campaign
On September 18, outgoing Senator Andrews died. Governor Millard F. Caldwell appointed Holland as Andrews' replacement for the remainder of the term, ending January 3, 1947.

Results

See also 
 1946 United States Senate elections

References 

1946
Florida
United States Senate